Kaminokuni Dam  is a gravity dam located in Hokkaido Prefecture in Japan. The dam is used for flood control, irrigation and water supply. The catchment area of the dam is 17.5 km2. The dam impounds about 22  ha of land when full and can store 3730 thousand cubic meters of water. The construction of the dam was started on 1985 and completed in 2002.

References

Dams in Hokkaido